Pappobolus argenteus is a species of flowering plant in the family Asteraceae. It is found only in Ecuador. Its natural habitat is subtropical or tropical dry shrubland. It is threatened by habitat loss.

References

argenteus
Endemic flora of Ecuador
Endangered flora of South America
Taxonomy articles created by Polbot